Bogue Homo is a stream in the U.S. state of Mississippi. It is a tributary to the Leaf River.

Name
Bogue Homo is a name derived from the Choctaw language meaning "red creek".

Variant names are:
Big Bogue Homo Creek
Boaghoma
Bogahoma
Bogohoma
Bogue Homa
Bogue Home Creek
Bogue Homo Creek
Bogueahoma
Boguehoma
Boguehomo

References

Rivers of Mississippi
Rivers of Jasper County, Mississippi
Rivers of Jones County, Mississippi
Rivers of Perry County, Mississippi
Mississippi placenames of Native American origin